George Haas may refer to:
 George Haas Jr., American businessman and polo player
 George Haas III, American sport shooter
 George Haas & Sons, a confectioner in San Francisco, California
 Mule Haas (George William Haas), American baseball player
 Eddie Haas (George Edwin Haas), American baseball player

See also
 Georg Haas (disambiguation)